Marina Fernandes De Barros Caskey  (born 1978, Aracaju, Sergipe) is a Brazilian scientist, immunologist and professor at Rockefeller University.

She graduated with a degree in Medicine (MD) from the Federal University of Sergipe. After medical training in Brazil, she did an internal medicine residency at Mount Sinai Morningside (then known at St Luke's), and a fellowship in infectious disease at Cornell's NewYork–Presbyterian Hospital.  After her medical training, she did clinical research work on HIV vaccine and vaccine adjuvant development in the lab of Nobel laureate Ralph M. Steinman.  Now as a faculty member of Rockefeller, she has led in human clinical trials of neutralizing antibodies against HIV.

Selected publications 

 

S. Vasan, S. J. Schlesinger, Z. Chen, A. Hurley, A. Lombardo, S. Than, P. Adesanya, C. Bunce, M. Boaz, R. Boyle, E. Sayeed, L. Clark, D. Dugin, M. Boente-Carrera, C. Schmidt, Q. Fang, L. Ba, Y. Huang, G.J. Zaharatos, D.F. Gardiner, M. Caskey, L. Seamons, M. Ho, L. Dally, C. Smith, J. Cox, D.K. Gill, J. Gilmour, M.C. Keefer, P. Fast, D. D. Ho. Phase 1 Safety and Immunogenicity Evaluation of ADMVA, a Multigenic, Modified Vaccinia Ankara-HIV-1 B./C Candidate Vaccine. PLoS One. 2010 Jan 25;5(1):e8816. 
Longhi, M.P., Trumpfheller, C., Idoyaga, J., Caskey, M., Matos, I., Kluger, C., Salazar, A.M., Colonna, M., and Steinman, R.M. Dendritic cells require a systemic type 1 interferon response to mature and induce CD4+ Th1 immunity with poly IC as adjuvant. J Exp Med 2009. 206:1589–1602. 
Trumpfheller C, Caskey M, Nchinda G, Longhi MP, Mizenina O, Huang Y, Schlesinger SJ, Colonna M, Steinman RM. The microbial mimic poly IC induces durable and protective CD4+ T cell immunity together with a dendritic cell targeted vaccine. Proc Natl Acad Sci U S A. 2008 Feb 19;105(7):2574-9. 
Morgan DJ, Caskey MF, Abbehusen C, Oliveira-Filho J, Araujo C, Porto AF, Santos SB, Orge GO, Joia MJ, Muniz AL, Siqueira I, Glesby MJ, Carvalho E. Brain magnetic resonance imaging white matter lesions are frequent in HTLV-I carriers and do not discriminate from HAM/TSP. AIDS Res Hum Retroviruses. 2007 Dec;23(12):1499-504. 
Caskey MF; Morgan DJ; Giozza SP; Muniz AL; Carvalho EM; Glesby MJ. Clinical Manifestations of HTLV-I infection: a Case-Control study. AIDS Res Hum Retroviruses. 2007 Mar;23(3):365-71.

References

Federal University of Sergipe alumni
Living people
1978 births
Brazilian scientists